Augusta Municipal Airport  is located approximately  west of Augusta in Butler County, Kansas, United States, on the south side of US-54/US-400 highway.  The airport is in the Wichita Metropolitan Service Area and benefits from the many area manufacturers of general aviation aircraft.  It is owned by the city of Augusta.

Facilities

In the year ending June 30, 2015 the airport had 36,000 general aviation aircraft operations, average 99 per day. 105 aircraft are based at this airport in 2015: 85% single-engine and 15% multi-engine with one jet and four helicopters. The airport has seven independent T-Hangar buildings, each holding up to ten aircraft. The airport and city of Augusta are in the process of adding up to four additional T-hangars in the near term, adding storage capacity for up to forty aircraft.

Nearby airports

Other airports in Wichita
 Wichita Mid-Continent Airport
 Colonel James Jabara Airport
 Beech Factory Airport
 Cessna Aircraft Field
 McConnell Air Force Base
 Westport Airport

Other airports in metro
 El Dorado / Captain Jack Thomas Airport
Other airports in region
 List of airports in Kansas
 List of airports in Oklahoma

References

External links
 Airport website

Airports in Kansas
Buildings and structures in Butler County, Kansas